Jeroen Van Herzeele (born September 13, 1965) is a Belgian jazz saxophonist.  He was born in Zottegem.  He plays in various bands such as Greetings From Mercury, Maak's Spirit, Octurn, Tomas and Co, Ivan Paduart etc...  He won the Belgian Golden Django in 1999 for best Flemish artist.

References
 Jazz in Belgium biography

Van Herzeele, Jeroen
Van Herzeele, Jeroen
Van Herzeele, Jeroen
Living people
21st-century saxophonists
Octurn members